The Dunn–Erwin Twins was the final moniker of the minor league baseball teams based in Dunn, North Carolina in partnership with Erwin, North Carolina from 1946 to 1950. The Dunn–Erwin teams played exclusively as members of the Class D level Tobacco State League and hosted home games at the Dunn High School Park.

History 
Dunn, North Carolina first hosted minor league play in 1946, with the team playing in partnership with neighboring Erwin, North Carolina.  The "Dunn–Erwin Twins" became charter members of the six–team Class D level Tobacco State League. The Angier–Fuquay Springs Bulls, Clinton Blues, Sanford Spinners, Smithfield–Selma Leafs and Wilmington Pirates joined Dunn–Erwin as charter members in Tobacco State League play.

In their first season of minor league play, the 1946 Dunn–Erwin Twins finished last in the Tobacco State League standings. The Twins finished the 1946 Tobacco State League regular season with a 48–70 record to place 6th, finishing 22.5 games behind the 1st place Sanford Spinners. Playing under managers James Guinn, Alton Stephenson and Dwight Law, Dunn–Erwin did not qualify for the playoffs, won by the Angier–Fuquay Springs Bulls.

In 1947, J.E. Jackson was selected as president of the Dunn–Erwin Twins, with E.M. Bost, vice–president and C.J. Adams, business manager.

Continuing Tobacco State League play, the 1947 Dunn–Erwin Twins finished in 4th place and reached the playoffs as the league expanded to eight teams. Playing under managers Jack Bell and Bill Auerette in the eight–team league, Dunn–Erwin ended the regular season with a 62–62 record. The Twins finished 23.5 games behind the 1st place Sanford Spinners in the regular season standings. In the 1st round of the playoffs, the Lumberton Cubs defeated the Dunn-Erwin Twins 4 games to 1, as the Sanford Spinners eventually became the league champions.

In 1948, the Dunn–Erwin Twins continued play and finished last in the Tobacco State League standings. The Twins ended the regular season in 8th place with a 49–89 record, playing under managers Carl McQuillen, Babe Bost and Gaither Riley. The Twins finished 32.0 games behind the 1st placed Sanford Spinners in the final Tobacco State League standings. Dunn–Erwin did not qualify for the playoffs, won by the Red Springs Red Robins.

The 1949 Dunn–Erwin Twins won the Tobacco State League pennant and advanced to the finals. The Twins ended the regular season with a record of 84–54, playing under manager Jim Staton and finished 5.0 games ahead of the 2nd place Red Springs Red Robins in the regular season standings. In the 1st round of the playoffs, the Dunn-Erwin Twins defeated the Lumberton Auctioneers 4 games to 1 and advanced. In the Finals, the Red Springs Red Robins defeated the Dunn-Erwin Twins 4 games to 1. Pitcher Clarence Condit of Dunn-Erwin
led the Tobacco State League with 20 wins and 264 strikeouts, while teammate Granville Denning led the league with 119 RBI.
 
In their final season, the 1950 Dunn–Erwin Twins relocated during the season and finished last in the Tobacco State League  standings. On June 16, 1950, the Dunn-Erwin Twins, with a record of 11–34 moved to Whiteville, North Carolina. Finishing the season as the Whiteville Tobs, the team compiled a record of 28–48 based in Whiteville. Overall, the team finished with a record of 39–92, to place 8th, missing the Tobacco State League playoffs. Playing under returning manager Jim Staton, the Twins/Tobs finished 51.0 games behind the 1st place Lumberton Auctioneers. The Twins/Tobs team failed to qualify for the playoffs, won by the Rockingham Eagles. The Tobacco State League permanently folded following the 1950 season.

Dunn, North Carolina has not hosted another minor league team.

The ballpark
The Dunn, North Carolina based minor league teams were noted to have played home games at the Dunn High School Park.

Timeline

Year–by–year records

Notable alumni
Duke Maas (1949)

References

External links
 Baseball Reference

Defunct minor league baseball teams
Professional baseball teams in North Carolina
Defunct baseball teams in North Carolina
Baseball teams established in 1946
Baseball teams disestablished in 1950
Harnett County, North Carolina
Tobacco State League teams